Quazi Tarikul Islam is a Bangladeshi physician and academic. As of 2017, he is a councilor and controller of examination in the Bangladesh College of Physicians and Surgeons. He has served as a member of the Regional Technical Advisor Group for Dengue, SEARO, WHO. He has over 123 publications in national and international journals. He was the founder Governor of American College of Physicians Bangladesh Chapter. He is a Member in the National Technical Advisory Committee for COVID 19

Early life and education
Islam was born in Khulna. He completed MBBS from Rajshahi Medical College. He completed FCPS (Medicine) from Bangladesh College of Physicians and Surgeons on 1987. He is the Overseas Regional advisor, Royal College of Physicians of Edinburgh, UK (2019-2024). He is also Executive Member of International Society of Internal Medicine (ISIM) (2018-2021)

Career
Islam was the Professor of Medicine both in Rajshahi Medical College (2007-2009) and Dhaka Medical College (2009-2011). He is the Editor in Chief, National guideline for clinical management of Dengue syndrome 2020. He is the Author of “ 51 cases in Clinical Medicine” December 2019  
After retirement he joined as a professor of medicine in Popular Medical College

References

Further reading
 

Academic staff of the University of Rajshahi
Bangladeshi physicians
Living people
1954 births
Academic staff of Dhaka Medical College and Hospital